Moreno (born Moreno Donadoni on November 27, 1989) is an Italian rapper. He rose to fame after winning the 12th series of the Italian talent show Amici di Maria De Filippi.

He has recorded 3 albums and over 10 singles, selling over 200,000 copies in Italy as of 2019. He has worked with some of the most important figures on the contemporary Italian music scene like Emma Marrone, Fiorella Mannoia, J-Ax, Annalisa, Club Dogo, Alex Britti, Federica Abbate and Fabri Fibra.

Moreno participated once at Sanremo Music Festival and won two Wind Music Awards.

Biography 
Donadoni was born in Genova but his mother is from Palermo and his father is from Naples.

In February 2013 Moreno joins Amici di Maria De Filippi, becoming the first rapper to be admitted to the talent show. Below he joined the Fase Serale of the program and became part of the team led by Emma Marrone. On June 1, 2013, he was proclaimed the winner of the talent show, and was also awarded the journalistic critics' prize.

His debut album, Stecca, was released in June 2013 and, as of July 2013, has spent eight weeks at number one on the Italian Albums Chart, being certified triple platinum by the FIMI for over 120,000 units sold. His debut single, "Che confusione", peaked at number six of Italian's chart and was lately certified Platinum by the FIMI for over 30,000 units sold. Both the album and the single are the most successful records of the rapper, winning two Wind Music Awards in 2014.

His second album in studio, Incredibile, peaked at umber two of Italian Albums Chart in 2014 and was certified gold for  25,000 units sold. The record project has important collaborations, including J-Ax, Fiorella Mannoia, Annalisa, Gué Pequeno and Alex Britti. The lead single, "Sempre mai", peaked at number 25 and became media success song. In 2014 he was selected as the mentor of Amici di Maria De Filippi's thirteen edition with Miguel Bosé. Moreno participated in the Sanremo Music Festival 2015 with the song "Oggi ti parlalo così", included in the re-edition of the album Incredibile.

On September 2, 2016, Moreno published his third studio album, Slogan, becoming his third Top-ten records on the Italian Chart, while both the promotional singles do not entered on Italian Singles Chart. The album includes duets with Deborah Iurato and Federica Abbate.

In 2017 he was selected as a contestant for the reality show L'Isola dei Famosi, being eliminated at the tenth week. Since 2019 he has been called as a commentator on the sports programmes of the television network Sportitalia.

Disputes

With Emis Killa 
Emis Killa and Moreno are certainly among the most popular young rappers of 2010s in the hip-hop made in Italy. Between the two, however, does not seem to run good blood...
In 2009, during the Final battle of Tecniche Perfette (Freestyle battle), Moreno had attacked Emis Killa because he had not voted for him. Emis Killa swears that that episode has forgotten and he said: "We have now made peace, he's nonetheless apologized to me for having that reaction..."
Yet, in spite of the peace, Emis Killa has ruled out a collaboration with Moreno, saying: "He has lost credibility in the eyes of those who represent the world of rap. Working with him I would do a lot of my fans unhappy, because the mass thinks in his own way... "

Discography

Album

Singles

Moreno with AED

Album 
 2009 – No grazie
 2012 – No grazie pt.2

Mixtape 
 2011 – AED Revolution
 2011 – A.E.D.L.A.N.D
 2012 – UA Mixtape
 2013 – Tu devi essere pazzo con Paola & Chiara.

References

External links 
 

1989 births
Living people
Italian rappers
Singing talent show winners
Musicians from Genoa